The Championnat de France de water-polo féminin is the premier championship for women's water polo clubs in France. First held in 1983, it is currently contested by seven teams. It is currently granted two spots in the Champions Cup and two in the LEN Trophy.

2011-12 Teams
  Choisy-le-Roi
  Lille
  Nancy
  Olympic Nice
  St. Jean d'Angély
  Strasbourg
  Union Saint-Bruno

Champions
  Nancy (13)
 1994, 1995, 1996, 1997, 1998, 2000, 2001, 2002, 2003, 2004, 2005, 2006, 2008
  Dauphins Créteil (8)
 1986, 1987, 1988, 1989, 1990, 1991, 1992, 1993
  Olympic Nice (5)
 2007, 2009, 2010, 2011, 2012
  Racing France (3)
 1983, 1984, 1985
  Pélican Valenciennes (1)
 1999

See also
 Championnat de France (male counterpart)

References

2
France
waterpolo
Women's water polo in France
Recurring sporting events established in 1983
1983 establishments in France